"Breathe and Stop" is the second single released by Q-Tip from his debut album Amplified, produced by Jay Dee. The video to this single featured Q-Tip in unusual attire dancing with girls.

The song charted at number 71 on the Billboard Hot 100.

The looping instrumental has been used as background music for some segments of Billy Bush's nationally syndicated radio show.

Charts

Weekly charts

Year-end charts

References

Q-Tip (musician) songs
2000 singles
Song recordings produced by J Dilla
1999 songs
Arista Records singles
Music videos directed by Hype Williams
Songs written by J Dilla
Songs written by Q-Tip (musician)
Songs written by Claydes Charles Smith